Kiyoshi Misaki (見崎 清志、born 13 January 1946) is a former Japanese racing driver.

Kiyoshi Misaki finished third in the 1971 Macau Grand Prix, driving a JRM AC7, behind Jan Bussell and Riki Ohkubo.

24 Hours of Le Mans results

References

1946 births
Living people
Japanese racing drivers
24 Hours of Le Mans drivers
World Sportscar Championship drivers